Bangladesh Jatiotabadi Chatra Dal ( Jatiyôtabadee Chhatrô Dôl), also known as J.C.D, is the student wing of the Bangladesh Nationalist Party (BNP). Many of the top BNP leaders and policy-makers today were once closely associated with JCD and developed as student leaders.

History 
After the Bangladesh Nationalist Party was founded by Ziaur Rahman, he realized a strong student organization was needed to cherish future leaders, and founded Chhatra Dal on 1 January 1979. As the student wing of the BNP, Chatra Dal has adopted a 19-point programme, based on the mother organization's structure and approach. Chatra Dal was one of the Vanguard organisation in the democracy movement against Military dictator Hussain Muhammed Ershad.

Bangladesh Jatiotabadi Chatra Dal is led by a committee, of whom all the members are students. The Dal has 736 member national committee. The committee formed in 2016 came under criticism from party activists for including nonstudents and people with criminal cases filed against them; despite Chairperson of BNP Khaleda Zia forbidding it. It also had members who were victims of forced disappearance.

Controversy 
Jatiyatabadi Chhatra Dal carried out a campaign of harassment against the NGO Proshika in 2004. Its headquarters were laid by SA Khaleq led Chhatra Dal. Two local offices of the NGO in Mehdiganj, Barisal were damaged by Chhatra Dal activist. This was done as part of the then Bangladesh Nationalist Party-led government as part of a campaign of harassment against the NGO. JCD activist attacked opposition student bodies, journalists, and vandalised the office of Dhaka University Teachers Association president AAMS Arefin Siddique on 11 September 2004. On 15 October 2015 Jatiyatabadi Chhatra Dal and Islami Chhatra Shibir fought between themselves in BL College in Daulatpur. Bangladesh Rifles and riot police were employed in the college after the violence.

In 2002, Sony, a brilliant student of BUET, died in a shoot out between two fractions of JCD. On 19 November 2006, JCD attacked and injured 5 activists of Chhatra Sangram Parishad and exploded bombs in Dhaka University.  Bangladesh Police filed cases against 150 activists of JCD for attacking police during fractional protests in Sylhet. President of Jhenidah district unit of Chhatra Dal, Ashraful Islam Pintu, was arrested with a gun and bomb on 9 November 2008.

On 19 January 2010 factional clashes of JCD left 25 people including proctor and 4 police officers. 200 activists of JCD attacked its own headquarters in Naya Paltan on 12 December 2010 over the formation of unit committee. Saiduzzaman Pasha,a Dhaka University activist of Chhatra Dal was arrested on 28 January 2010 when pictures of him armed with a gun during clashes between different fractions of Chhatra Dal emerged. He has several criminal cases against him, including for extortion.

On 26 May 2013 JCD vandalised 25 vehicles during pro Tarique Rahman protests in Dhaka. On 15 August 2013 JCD engaged in fractional clashes during Khaleda Zia's birthday celebration in Chittagong city and vandalised private property. Chhatra Dal attacked a demonstration of Bangladesh Awami League backed Chhatra League in Narsingdi on 28 November 2013, resulting in the death of two league men.

Fractional clashes between JCD activist in front of BNP office in Naya Paltan, left 10 activists injured on 17 March 2014. On 7 March 2015, a JCD leader was injured while attempting to build a bomb in Chittagong. The central President Rajib Ahsan of Chhatra Dal and 5 associates were arrested with the drug Ya Ba on 19 July 2015 in Dumki upazila, Patuakhali.

See also
 Bangladesh Nationalist Party
 Ziaur Rahman
 Begum Khaleda Zia
 Politics of Bangladesh
 Tarique Rahman

References 

Student organisations in Bangladesh
Bangladesh Nationalist Party
Bangladeshi student movements
Student wings of political parties in Bangladesh
1979 establishments in Bangladesh
Student organizations established in 1979